Mikalay Shvydakow (born 6 July 1980) is a Belarusian former professional footballer.

External links

1980 births
Living people
Belarusian footballers
Association football midfielders
Belarusian expatriate footballers
Expatriate footballers in Ukraine
FC Torpedo Minsk players
FC Metalist Kharkiv players
FC SKVICH Minsk players
FC Naftan Novopolotsk players
FC Shakhtyor Soligorsk players
FC Torpedo-BelAZ Zhodino players